The  was a light machine gun used by the Imperial Japanese Army in the interwar period and in World War II. It was first introduced in 1936, and fires the 6.5x50mm Arisaka from 30-round top-mounted magazines. A combination of unimpressive ballistic performance and a lack of reliability caused the Imperial Japanese Army to try to replace the Type 96 with the Type 99 light machine gun, though both saw major usage until the end of the war.

History and development 
Combat experience in the Manchurian Incident of 1931 and subsequent actions in Manchuria and northern China reaffirmed to the Japanese army the utility of machine guns in providing covering fire for advancing infantry. The earlier Type 11 light machine gun was a lightweight machine gun, which could be easily transportable by an infantry squad into combat. However, the open hopper design of the Type 11 allowed dust and grit to enter into the gun, which was liable to jam in muddy or dirty conditions due to issues with poor dimensional tolerances. This gave the weapon a bad reputation with Japanese troops, and led to calls for its redesign. The Army's Kokura Arsenal tested the Czech ZB vz. 26 machine gun, samples of which had been captured from the National Revolutionary Army of the Republic of China, and (after borrowing certain elements) issued a new design, designated the Type 96 light machine gun, in 1936. The gun was produced at Kokura,  Nagoya Arsenal and Mukden between 1936 and 1943, with a total production run of about 41,000.

While the Japanese design was completely different internally, it did resemble the ZB vz. 26 in its basic layout using the top feed magazine and a bipod mount. The similar looking Type 97 heavy tank machine gun however was a true license built copy of the ZB design firing the heavier 7.7x58mm Arisaka cartridge; it was mounted in the tanks of the Japanese Army.

Design 

The Type 96 light machine gun was almost identical in construction to the Type 11 in that it was an air-cooled, gas-operated design based on the French Hotchkiss M1909 machine gun. As with the Type 11, it continued to use the same 6.5x50mm Arisaka cartridges as the Type 38 rifle infantry rifle, although the more powerful 7.7x58mm Arisaka round had already been adopted and was starting to enter into service with front line combat units. Due to its visual resemblance to the British Bren light machine gun they are often mistakenly regarded as clones.

The major difference from the Type 11 was the top-mounted curved detachable box magazine holding 30 rounds, which somewhat increased reliability and lessened the weight of the gun. The finned gun barrel could also be rapidly changed to avoid overheating. The Type 96 had a blade front sight and a leaf rear sight, with graduations from 200 to 1,500 meters, with windage adjustment. A 2.5X telescopic sight with a 10 degree field of view could be attached at the right side of the gun.

The Type 96 also had a folding bipod attached to the gas block, and could be fitted with the standard infantry bayonet, which could be attached to the gas block below the barrel, making it, alongside the later Type 99 the only machine gun used in the Second World War that a bayonet could be attached to. The gun had no select-fire capability.

Despite the fact it could cause stoppages, designer Kijiro Nambu did nothing to address the dimensional tolerance issue between the bolt and barrel, which would lead to feed failure if casings got stuck in the chamber. In order to ensure reliable feeding (theoretically), Nambu resorted to oiling the cartridges via an oil pump in the magazine loader. In practice, this tended to worsen the problem instead, as the oiled cartridges tended to become coated with dust and sand. This feature and its inherent faults were dropped with the introduction of the Type 99 light machine gun.

Combat record 
The Type 96 came into active service in 1936 and was intended to replace the older Type 11; however the Type 11 had already been produced in large quantities, and both weapons remained in service until the end of the war. The Type 96 was regarded as rugged and reliable, but its 6.5 mm bullets lacked penetration against cover, especially in comparison to other rifle rounds of the day such as the American .30-06 Springfield and the design was supplanted by the more powerful Type 99 light machine gun with the larger 7.7 mm bullet in 1937.

After World War II, it was used by Indonesian forces during the Indonesian National Revolution against Dutch forces notably during the attack on Jogjakarta 1949. It was used by the Viet Minh and the North Vietnamese forces during the First and Second Indochina Wars.

Users

Notes

References

External links 
 Modern Firearms
 Taki's Imperial Japanese Army page
 US Technical Manual E 30-480
 JapaneseWeapons.net

Light machine guns
Machine guns of Japan
World War II infantry weapons of Japan
World War II machine guns
Machine guns of Manchukuo
Military equipment introduced in the 1930s